Hwang Soon-Min  (Hanja: 黄順旻; born 14 September 1990) is a South Korean footballer who plays for Suwon FC.

External links 

1990 births
Living people
Association football midfielders
South Korean footballers
Shonan Bellmare players
Daegu FC players
Gimcheon Sangmu FC players
Korea National League players
J2 League players
K League 1 players
K League 2 players
South Korean expatriate footballers
South Korean expatriate sportspeople in Japan
Expatriate footballers in Japan